The Lac-Robertson Generating Station is a 21.6 MW hydroelectric power station in east of the Côte-Nord region of Quebec, Canada.
It supplies power to the local communities, and is not connected to the main grid.

Location

The Lac-Robertson Generating Station is in the unorganized territory of Petit-Mécatina in Le Golfe-du-Saint-Laurent Regional County Municipality.
The dam crosses the northeast end of the Petit lac Plamodon where it drains into the Véco River upstream from the north end of Lac Monger.
The Lac-Robertson powerhouse is in the base of the dam.
The spillway releases water from the southeast bank of the Petit lac Plamodon into the small Lac Soulier, which drains via Lac Cuillère into the west end of Lac Monger. 
From Lac Monger the Veco River flows a short distance into the Baie des Ha! Ha!.

Dam

The Hydro-Québec dam on the Véco River created the Robertson Reservoir for the Lac-Robertson Generating Station.
The reservoir contains the former Lake Robertson and Lake Plamondon.
The  Lac-Robertson Dam was built in 1994.

Power plant

The Lac-Robertson hydraulic generating station has a capacity of 21.6 MW.
It is not connected to the main power grid in Quebec.
It is connected to the isolated diesel customers in the Labrador Straits region, supplying power to them when a surplus is available.
The facility has two turbines.
The plant was commissioned in 1995.

Fish
The reservoir contains rainbow smelt, arctic char, brook trout and landlocked salmon.
The water quality was monitored from 1990 to 1997.
The dam had the effect of increasing mercury content in the lake water.
Degradation of organic matter in the flooded zone releases mercury, which is transformed into methyl mercury and enters the food chain.
These changes may have affected the water quality of the Véco River and Ha! Ha! Bay.

Notes

Sources

Dams in Quebec
Hydro-Québec
Dams completed in 1994
Côte-Nord